Tom Iansek is a Melbourne-based Australian record producer and songwriter, best known for his work with #1 Dads, Big Scary, and No Mono. Iansek has produced music for Emma Louise, Airling, Lanks, and Slum Sociable.

Career

2006-present: Big Scary

In 2006, Iansek formed the folk rock band Big Scary with Joanna Syme. In late 2008, Big Scary went into the studio for the first time, recording six live tracks in a single day. In October 2008, the duo uploaded "The Apple Song" to Triple J Unearthed and officially released it in December 2008, alongside a self-titled debut EP. As of 2021, Big Scary have released four studio albums: Vacation (2011), Not Art (2013), Animal (2016), and Daisy (2021).

2009: Small Time Hero
In 2009, Iansek released his debut album, Top of the Tree, under the moniker Small Time Hero. Iansek wrote, produced, mixed, and self-released the album.

2010–present: #1 Dads

In 2010, Iansek formed the alternative rock band #1 Dads as a side project during downtime, with music that is "more acoustic than electronic in construction". As of 2021, #1 Dads have released three studio albums: Man of Leisure (2011), About Face (2014), and Golden Repair (2020).

2017–present: No Mono
In 2017, Iansek launched the band No Mono with Tom Snowden. Snowdon said of the collaboration, "For the past two years, we've been developing songs for this project, which we recently recorded at the Pieater studio in Collingwood. We like similar music and sounds and are great friends. It's been a very intuitive process. That's what this project is really about—exploring and cultivating our artistic relationship; we just follow our ears and our guts". As of 2021, No Mono have released two studio albums: Islands Part 1 (2018) and Islands Part 2 (2019).

Other work
In April 2017, Iansek re-released his debut album on vinyl under the title Small Time Hero, Top of the Tree for Record Store Day. In 2017, Iansek said "This is the first album I ever made. There was great joy and excitement for me making it. It was the beginning of my love for the entire music-making process, from songwriting and arranging to capturing the performance. I present it now to unashamedly show the beginnings of my journey into making music".

In 2018, Iansek co-produced The Paper Kites' third studio album, On the Train Ride Home.

Personal life
Iansek has a son, born in May 2019.

Solo discography

Albums

Featured as solo musician

Awards and nominations

ARIA Music Awards
The ARIA Music Awards is an annual awards ceremony that recognises excellence, innovation, and achievement across all genres of Australian music. Tom Iansek has been nominated for one award.

! 
|-
| 2017
| Tom Iansek for Animal by Big Scary
| ARIA Award for Producer of the Year
| 
| 
|-

Music Victoria Awards
The Music Victoria Awards are an annual awards night celebrating music from the state of Victoria. They commenced in 2005.

! 
|-
| 2015
| Tom Iansek
| Best Male Musician
| 
| rowspan="2"| 
|-
| 2018
| Tom Iansek
| Best Male Musician
| 
|-
| rowspan="2"| 2020
| Tom Iansek
| Best Musician
| 
| rowspan="2"| 
|-
| Tom Iansek for Golden Repair by #1 Dads
| Best Producer
| 
|-

References

Australian record producers
Australian songwriters
American songwriters
Australian male composers
Living people
Year of birth missing (living people)